In computer science, the Earley parser is an algorithm for parsing strings that belong to a given context-free language, though (depending on the variant) it may suffer problems with certain nullable grammars. The algorithm, named after its inventor, Jay Earley, is a chart parser that uses dynamic programming; it is mainly used for parsing in computational linguistics. It was first introduced in his dissertation in 1968 (and later appeared in an abbreviated, more legible, form in a journal).

Earley parsers are appealing because they can parse all context-free languages, unlike LR parsers and LL parsers, which are more typically used in compilers but which can only handle restricted classes of languages.  The Earley parser executes in cubic time in the general case , where n is the length of the parsed string, quadratic time for unambiguous grammars , and linear time for all deterministic context-free grammars. It performs particularly well when the rules are written left-recursively.

Earley recogniser 
The following algorithm describes the Earley recogniser. The recogniser can be modified to create a parse tree as it recognises, and in that way can be turned into a parser.

The algorithm 
In the following descriptions, α, β, and γ represent any string of terminals/nonterminals (including the empty string), X and Y represent single nonterminals, and a represents a terminal symbol.

Earley's algorithm is a top-down dynamic programming algorithm. In the following, we use Earley's dot notation: given a production X → αβ, the notation X → α • β represents a condition in which α has already been parsed and β is expected.

Input position 0 is the position prior to input.  Input position n is the position after accepting the nth token.  (Informally, input positions can be thought of as locations at token boundaries.)  For every input position, the parser generates a state set.  Each state is a tuple (X → α • β, i), consisting of

 the production currently being matched (X → α β)
 the current position in that production (visually represented by the dot •)
 the position i in the input at which the matching of this production began: the origin position

(Earley's original algorithm included a look-ahead in the state; later research showed this to have little practical effect on the parsing efficiency, and it has subsequently been dropped from most implementations.)

A state is finished when its current position is the last position of the right side of the production, that is, when there is no symbol to the right of the dot • in the visual representation of the state.

The state set at input position k is called S(k).  The parser is seeded with S(0) consisting of only the top-level rule.  The parser then repeatedly executes three operations:  prediction, scanning, and completion.

 Prediction:  For every state in S(k) of the form (X → α • Y β, j) (where j is the origin position as above), add (Y → • γ, k) to S(k) for every production in the grammar with Y on the left-hand side (Y → γ).
 Scanning: If a is the next symbol in the input stream, for every state in S(k) of the form (X → α • a β, j), add (X → α a • β, j) to S(k+1).
 Completion: For every state in S(k) of the form (Y → γ •, j), find all states in S(j) of the form (X → α • Y β, i) and add (X → α Y • β, i) to S(k).

Duplicate states are not added to the state set, only new ones.  These three operations are repeated until no new states can be added to the set.  The set is generally implemented as a queue of states to process, with the operation to be performed depending on what kind of state it is.

The algorithm accepts if (X → γ •, 0) ends up in S(n), where (X → γ) is the top level-rule and n the input length, otherwise it rejects.

Pseudocode 
Adapted from Speech and Language Processing by Daniel Jurafsky and James H. Martin, 

DECLARE ARRAY S;

function INIT(words)
    S ← CREATE_ARRAY(LENGTH(words) + 1)
    for k ← from 0 to LENGTH(words) do
        S[k] ← EMPTY_ORDERED_SET

function EARLEY_PARSE(words, grammar)
    INIT(words)
    ADD_TO_SET((γ → •S, 0), S[0])
    for k ← from 0 to LENGTH(words) do
        for each state in S[k] do  // S[k] can expand during this loop
            if not FINISHED(state) then
                if NEXT_ELEMENT_OF(state) is a nonterminal then
                    PREDICTOR(state, k, grammar)         // non_terminal
                else do
                    SCANNER(state, k, words)             // terminal
            else do
                COMPLETER(state, k)
        end
    end
    return chart

procedure PREDICTOR((A → α•Bβ, j), k, grammar)
    for each (B → γ) in GRAMMAR_RULES_FOR(B, grammar) do
        ADD_TO_SET((B → •γ, k), S[k])
    end

procedure SCANNER((A → α•aβ, j), k, words)
    if a ⊂ PARTS_OF_SPEECH(words[k]) then
        ADD_TO_SET((A → αa•β, j), S[k+1])
    end

procedure COMPLETER((B → γ•, x), k)
    for each (A → α•Bβ, j) in S[x] do
        ADD_TO_SET((A → αB•β, j), S[k])
    end

Example 
Consider the following simple grammar for arithmetic expressions:
<P> ::= <S>      # the start rule
<S> ::= <S> "+" <M> | <M>
<M> ::= <M> "*" <T> | <T>
<T> ::= "1" | "2" | "3" | "4"
With the input:
 2 + 3 * 4

This is the sequence of state sets:

The state (P → S •, 0) represents a completed parse.  This state also appears in S(3) and S(1), which are complete sentences.

Constructing the parse forest 
Earley's dissertation briefly describes an algorithm for constructing parse trees by adding a set of pointers from each non-terminal in an Earley item back to the items that caused it to be recognized.  But Tomita noticed that this does not take into account the relations between symbols, so if we consider the grammar S → SS | b and the string bbb, it only notes that each S can match one or two b's, and thus produces spurious derivations for bb and bbbb as well as the two correct derivations for bbb.

Another method is to build the parse forest as you go, augmenting each Earley item with a pointer to a shared packed parse forest (SPPF) node labelled with a triple (s, i, j) where s is a symbol or an LR(0) item (production rule with dot), and i and j give the section of the input string derived by this node. A node's contents are either a pair of child pointers giving a single derivation, or a list of "packed" nodes each containing a pair of pointers and representing one derivation.  SPPF nodes are unique (there is only one with a given label), but may contain more than one derivation for ambiguous parses.  So even if an operation does not add an Earley item (because it already exists), it may still add a derivation to the item's parse forest.

 Predicted items have a null SPPF pointer.
 The scanner creates an SPPF node representing the non-terminal it is scanning.
 Then when the scanner or completer advance an item, they add a derivation whose children are the node from the item whose dot was advanced, and the one for the new symbol that was advanced over (the non-terminal or completed item).

SPPF nodes are never labeled with a completed LR(0) item: instead they are labelled with the symbol that is produced so that all derivations are combined under one node regardless of which alternative production they come from.

Optimizations 

Philippe McLean and R. Nigel Horspool in their paper "A Faster Earley Parser" combine Earley parsing with LR parsing and achieve an improvement in an order of magnitude.

See also 
 CYK algorithm
 Context-free grammar
 Parsing algorithms

Citations

Other reference materials

Implementations

C, C++ 
 'Yet Another Earley Parser (YAEP)' – C/C++ libraries
 'C Earley Parser' – an Earley parser C

Haskell 
 'Earley' – an Earley parser DSL in Haskell

Java 
  – a Java implementation of the Earley algorithm
 PEN – a Java library that implements the Earley algorithm
 Pep – a Java library that implements the Earley algorithm and provides charts and parse trees as parsing artifacts
 digitalheir/java-probabilistic-earley-parser - a Java library that implements the probabilistic Earley algorithm, which is useful to determine the most likely parse tree from an ambiguous sentence

C# 

 coonsta/earley - An Earley parser in C#
 patrickhuber/pliant - An Earley parser that integrates the improvements adopted by Marpa and demonstrates Elizabeth Scott's tree building algorithm.
 ellisonch/CFGLib - Probabilistic Context Free Grammar (PCFG) Library for C# (Earley + SPPF, CYK)

JavaScript 
 Nearley – an Earley parser that's starting to integrate the improvements that Marpa adopted
 A Pint-sized Earley Parser – a toy parser (with annotated pseudocode) to demonstrate Elizabeth Scott's technique for building the shared packed parse forest
 lagodiuk/earley-parser-js – a tiny JavaScript implementation of Earley parser (including generation of the parsing-forest)
 digitalheir/probabilistic-earley-parser-javascript - JavaScript implementation of the probabilistic Earley parser

OCaml 
 Simple Earley - An implementation of a simple Earley-like parsing algorithm, with documentation.

Perl 
 Marpa::R2 – a Perl module.  Marpa is an Earley's algorithm that includes the improvements made by Joop Leo, and by Aycock and Horspool.
 Parse::Earley – a Perl module implementing Jay Earley's original algorithm

Python 
 Lark – an object-oriented, procedural implementation of an Earley parser, that outputs a SPPF.
 NLTK – a Python toolkit with an Earley parser
 Spark – an object-oriented little language framework for Python implementing an Earley parser
 spark_parser – updated and packaged version of the Spark parser above, which runs in both Python 3 and Python 2
 earley3.py – a stand-alone implementation of the algorithm in less than 150 lines of code, including generation of the parsing-forest and samples
 tjr_python_earley_parser - a minimal Earley parser in Python
 Earley Parsing - A well explained and complete Earley parser tutorial in Python with epsilon handling and Leo optimization for right-recursion.

Rust 
 Santiago – A lexing and parsing toolkit for Rust implementing an Earley parser.

Common Lisp 
 CL-Earley-parser – a Common Lisp library implementing an Earley parser

Scheme, Racket 
 Charty-Racket – a Scheme-Racket implementation of an Earley parser

Wolfram 

 properEarleyParser - A basic minimal implementation of an Earley parser in Wolfram programming language with some essential test cases.

Resources 
 The Accent compiler-compiler

Parsing algorithms
Dynamic programming